The black-backed antshrike (Thamnophilus melanonotus) is a species of bird in the family Thamnophilidae. It is found in Colombia and Venezuela, where its natural habitat is subtropical or tropical dry forests.

The black-backed antshrike was described by the English zoologist Philip Sclater in 1855 and given the binomial name Thamnophilus melanonotus. It was subsequently placed in the genus Sakesphorus. A molecular phylogenetic study published in 2007 found that Sakesphorus was polyphyletic and that three species including the black-backed antshrike were embedded within a clade containing members of Thamnophilus. The black-backed antshrike was therefore moved back to its original genus.

References

black-backed antshrike
Birds of Colombia
Birds of Venezuela
black-backed antshrike
black-backed antshrike
Taxonomy articles created by Polbot